Gong Deok-gwi (April 21, 1911 – November 24, 1997) was the wife of Yun Bo-seon, and thus was the second First Lady of South Korea from 1960 to 1962.

References

1911 births
1997 deaths
First Ladies of South Korea
Gong clan of Qufu